Björkvik is a locality situated in Katrineholm Municipality, Södermanland County, Sweden with 492 inhabitants in 2010. It is primarily a farming community interspersed by forests and lakes, with some larger estates dating back to the 17th century.

Notable people from Björkvik

Ernfrid Bogstedt, Swedish artist

References

External links 
https://web.archive.org/web/20080320041044/http://bjorkvik.org/

Populated places in Södermanland County
Populated places in Katrineholm Municipality